Maisie Richardson-Sellers is a British actress. She is known for her recurring role as Eva Sinclair on The CW series The Originals, as well as her starring roles as King Saul of Israel's daughter Michal in the ABC Biblical series Of Kings and Prophets and as Amaya Jiwe / Vixen and Charlie on The CW superhero series Legends of Tomorrow.

Early life 
Richardson-Sellers was born and raised in London. Her mother Joy Richardson is black Guyanese and her father is white British. Richardson-Sellers comes from a family of stage actors. She grew up attending private schools through bursaries and scholarships. In 2013, Richardson-Sellers graduated, with a degree in Archaeology and Anthropology, from Hertford College, University of Oxford, where she participated in and directed several plays, including Mephisto, Chatroom, and There Will Be Red.

Career 

After graduating from university, Richardson-Sellers started auditioning and landed her first role in Star Wars sequel Star Wars: The Force Awakens, in the cameo role of Korr Sella.

After wrapping filming for her The Force Awakens role, Richardson-Sellers booked her second role as Rebekah Mikaelson in the CW series The Originals in 2014, where the character of Rebekah inhabits a different body after a spell gone wrong. She later played the character of Eva Sinclair on The Originals. Executive Producer Michael Narducci described her performance as having "an incredibly strong sparkle" and "there's a great beauty – not only with physical beauty but there's a great inner beauty – that comes up in her performance. There's also just this incredible strength."

In early March 2015, it was announced that Richardson-Sellers would play a starring role in Of Kings and Prophets, a short-lived ABC drama series that was filmed in South Africa. In June 2016, it was reported that Richardson-Sellers would be playing Amaya Jiwe / Vixen on the second season of the CW series Legends of Tomorrow, who is the grandmother of the titular character in the CW Seed animated series Vixen. Her mother guest starred as a distant ancestor of Jiwe on two episodes, "Zari" and "No Country for Old Dads". After two seasons, Richardson-Sellers was cast in the new role of shapeshifter Charlie. Richardson-Sellers exited Legends of Tomorrow in 2020 at the end of the series' fifth season.

In 2018, Richardson-Sellers appeared in the short film Melody, directed by Bernard Kordieh. In May 2019, it was announced Richardson-Sellers would star in The Kissing Booth 2 as Chloe, directed by Vince Marcello for Netflix.

Personal life 
Richardson-Sellers openly identifies as queer. She is in a relationship with American singer Clay.

In 2017, along with her Arrowverse co-stars, Richardson-Sellers co-founded Shethority ("She + Authority"), an online global collective described as "a positive place for women and the feminine to inspire, empower, and share." Active members of the initiative include Melissa Benoist, Nicole Maines, Chyler Leigh, Caity Lotz, Tala Ashe, Emily Bett Rickards, Juliana Harkavy, Katie Cassidy, Candice Patton, and Danielle Panabaker. Through social media, women share their own stories and experiences on dealing with self-acceptance, homophobia, and workplace sexual harassment.

Filmography

References

External links 
 

21st-century British actresses
Alumni of the University of Oxford
Black British actresses
British television actresses
English LGBT actors
Living people
Queer actresses
Queer women
Year of birth missing (living people)
LGBT Black British people